HotJava Views was a productivity software suite developed by Sun Microsystems and implemented in Java. It was released in 1996 and was intended primarily for JavaStation or other JavaOS-based network computers.

HotJava Views consisted of four applications:

MailView IMAP4 e-mail client
CalendarView Group scheduling
WebView HotJava web browser
NameView Directory services

The graphical user interface of HotJava Views was quite novel in that it dispensed with some of the common features of GUIs in order to simplify the interface. Menu bars and overlapping, resizable windows were eliminated and a simple Selector icon bar was used to switch between applications. Other third-party Java applications could be added to the Selector.

References

Java platform software
Sun Microsystems software
Personal information managers
Calendaring software
Email clients